Rebecca Best (born 18 January 1964), also known as Rebecca O'Callaghan, is a female English-born former professional squash player. She was born in Sheffield, but represented Ireland. She reached a career-high world ranking of 6 in July 1988.

References

1964 births
Living people
Irish female squash players